Addictions is the third studio album and second major label album by French-Israeli singer Amir Haddad. It was released on 27 October 2017 in France through Warner Music Group. The album includes the singles "No Vacancy", "États d'Amour" and "Les Rues de ma peine". The album was re-released on 9 November 2018 and includes the singles "Longtemps" and "5 minutes avec toi". The album was re-released one more time on May 17, 2019, as an "ultimate edition".

Background
On 25 August 2017, Amir announced on Facebook that he would be releasing his new album on 27 October 2017 and the album would include the single "États d'Amour". He announced the title of the album to be Addictions on 7 September 2017, he also unveiled the album's cover art.

Critical reception
Katie Wilson from Wiwibloggs said, "there isn’t one track on the album that has been rushed or overlooked [...] combining upbeat pop with more mellow and heartfelt sounds [...] While he sings in French, his style is all-American, bringing in one of those classically lyricless techno choruses that bears resemblance to One Republic, from across the pond.". "Opium" was noted specifically as a standout track.

Track listing

Charts

Weekly charts

Year-end charts

Certifications

Release history

References

External links
 Official website

2017 albums
Amir Haddad albums